This  list of the highest points of the German states shows the highest mountain or hill in each German  federal state together with its height and links to lists of other mountains and hills.

Overview 
The lowest height occurs in the city of Bremen: at  32.5 m the highest natural point of the smallest German state is located in Friedehorst Park in the Bremen quarter of Burglesum, although the rubbish tip in Bremen-Blockland, whose summit reaches 49 m, is higher. The highest natural point in the capital city of Berlin, the Große Müggelberg, is, at 114.7 m still 5.4 metres lower than the rubble heap of the Teufelsberg, which was piled up after the Second World War and reaches a height of 120.1 m; but the highest point in Berlin is an artificially created mound of the Arkenberge, which attains a height of about 122 m. Together with the highest points of the states of Hamburg, Schleswig-Holstein and Mecklenburg-Vorpommern, none reaches a height of 200 m.

At 201 m, the Kutschenberg is the highest summit in Brandenburgs. However, the highest point in the state is actually a spot on the Heidehöhe which reaches 201.4 m, but whose summit lies a few metres over the border in the neighbouring state of Saxony.

The only summit of the sixteen that is not marked by a summit cross or a stone is the rise in Friedehorst Park. The summit of the Großer Beerberg lies within a biosphere reserve and is not, therefore, accessible to the public. However, peak baggers may count the observation platform which lies just below the summit.

List 
This list of the highest mountains or hills in each of the German states is sorted by height in metres (m) above sea level (NHN):

See also 
 Mountains
 List of the highest mountains in Germany

 List of mountains in Switzerland
 List of highest mountains in the world
 List of the highest mountains in the continents
 Ranges
 List of mountain ranges
 List of mountain and hill ranges in Germany

References 

!
 
German states
Highpointing